Kaswan is a Jat surname. Notable people with the surname include:

 Rahul Kaswan (born 1977), Indian politician
 Ram Singh Kaswan (born 1945), Indian politician, father of Rahul

Indian surnames